Styphelia perileuca, commonly known as montane green five-corners, is a plant in the heath family Ericaceae and is endemic to New South Wales. It is an erect, spreading shrub with broad leaves with a spiky tip, and yellowish-green and red tube-shaped flowers with the petals rolled back. It is only known from the eastern edge of the New England Tableland.

Description
The flowers are tube-shaped, yellowish green in colour with fine red stripes and hang singly from upper leaf axils. The stamens are straight and extend beyond the end of the petal tube. Flowering occurs mostly between September and January but flowers are also present in April.

Taxonomy and naming
Styphelia perileuca was first formally described in 1992 by Jocelyn Powell and published in Telopea. The specific epithet (perileuca) is derived from the Ancient Greek words peri meaning "around" and leukos meaning "white" referring to the thin white perimeter of the leaves.

Distribution and habitat
Montane green five-corners is only known from Cathedral Rock National Park, the New England National Park and near Maclean. It grows in shrubland near swamps and in forest.

Conservation
Styphelia perileuca is classified as "vulnerable" under the Australian Government Environment Protection and Biodiversity Conservation Act 1999 and the New South Wales Government Biodiversity Conservation Act 2016. The main threats to the species are its small population size and narrow distribution.

References

perileuca
Flora of New South Wales
Plants described in 1992